The Anna Lewis Mann Old People's Home is building complex located in northeast Portland, Oregon listed on the National Register of Historic Places.

Portland's Old Ladies' Home Society, organized on March 3, 1893, by pioneer Mary H. Holbrook, was referred to as the "prototype" for the Old People's Home in Gaston's "Portland, Oregon..." (1911). It was supported by charitable donations, the must substantial of which came from Henry W. Corbett and Amanda Reed. But the costs exceeded expectations. In 1908 Peter John Mann offered to purchase property and construct the home, under the condition that it serve all people, not just women. After Mann's death, his wife, Anna Mary E. Mann, carried forward his wishes by contributing a large portion of their estate to the cause. The building was completed by 1919.

See also
 National Register of Historic Places listings in Northeast Portland, Oregon

References

1911 establishments in Oregon
Residential buildings completed in 1911
National Register of Historic Places in Portland, Oregon
Tudor Revival architecture in Oregon
Northeast Portland, Oregon
Kerns, Portland, Oregon
Portland Historic Landmarks